The Canadian Olympic Curling Trials, marketed from 2009 through 2017 as the Roar of the Rings, are a quadrennial tournament held by Curling Canada that determines the Canadian men's and women's representatives for curling at the Winter Olympics. The system of qualification for the Curling Trials varies for each event, and can be quite complicated. One main reason for an Olympic qualifying event apart from the national championships (The Brier and the Scotties) is that provincial residency rules do not apply to the Olympic team. Curling was added to the Olympic programme in 1998, and a Canadian Olympic Trials have been held the year prior since 1997.

There were also Olympic Trials held in 1987 for the curling demonstration event at the 1988 Winter Olympics. The 1987 Trials were known as the Labatt National Curling Trials and were held April 19–25, 1987 in Calgary, the same site of the 1988 Winter Olympics. Linda Moore would skip the women's winning team and Ed Lukowich skipped the men's winner.

There were no trials for the 1992 Winter Olympics curling demonstration event. The winner of the 1991 Scott Tournament of Hearts (Julie Sutton) and the 1991 Labatt Brier (Kevin Martin) got to represent Canada at the event.

Men's champions

Women's champions

Notes

References

Sources

Curling Trials Backgrounder - thecurler.com

 
Canada at the Winter Olympics
Curling competitions in Canada